The Auteur Award is an honorary Satellite Award bestowed by the International Press Academy to recognize the "individual voices of filmmakers and their personal impact on the industry." It was first presented on December 17, 2005 at the 10th Annual Satellite Awards ceremony to George Clooney.

The trophy awarded to the honorees resembles the normal Satellite Award but is designated for Special Achievement, with the recipient's name and year engraved on the base. It was designed by Dalmatian sculptor Ante Marinović.

Honorees

Auteur Award

Special Achievement Award
Until 2005 the IPA honored outstanding entertainment industry professionals with the Special Achievement Award. The last Special Achievement Award donated to George Clooney "as an Auteur" founded the abovementioned Auteur Award.

References

External links
 International Press Academy website

Auteur
Awards established in 2005